The 1994 Asian Men's Softball Championship was an international softball tournament which featured seven nations which was held in Manila, Philippines.

Participants

References

Asian Men's Softball Championship
International softball competitions hosted by the Philippines
1994 in Philippine sport